Luigi Ceccarelli (born 20 April 1953 in Rimini, Italy) is an Italian composer.

Biography
Luigi Ceccarelli completed his musical studies in the ‘70s at the Gioachino Rossini Conservatory of Pesaro (Italy) where he studied Electronic Music and Composition with Walter Branchi, Giuliano Zosi and Guido Baggiani. 
His career as a composer began in 1975, and was strongly influenced by digital technology and research into Sound Spatialisation. In addition to his exclusively musical work right from the start he dedicated a significant part of his professional activity to experimental theatre, contemporary dance, cinema and visual arts.

After moving to Rome in 1978 he began to collaborate with the Gruppo di lavoro intercodice - ALTRO (inter-codex work-group), an artistic association led by the painter Achille Perilli, and during this period his contacts with artists in various other disciplines allowed him to develop forms of music that were closely related to the visual arts and the theater. With ALTRO he wrote and performed the music for the performance Abominable A, which was staged at the Palazzo delle Esposizioni in Rome. In 1981 ALTRO became a dance company with the name of AltroTeatro and, with the choreographer Lucia Latour, Ceccarelli wrote and performed the music for the group’s performances until 1994. These included the show Anihccam dedicated to the Futurist artist Fortunato Depero and staged at the Centre Georges Pompidou in Paris, which launched Ceccarelli’s international career.

In 1994 he made the radio-film (a story told only with sounds and music) La Guerra dei Dischi (The War of the Records), which was commissioned by Rai Radio 3 and based on a text by Stefano Benni. This was the beginning of Ceccarelli’s research into the relationship between music and recited texts, which led the composer to create a series of radio plays and audio plays for Rai Radio 3.

In 1996 his work Birds  for bass clarinet and birdsong was awarded the first prize in the competition of the IMEB (Institut international de musique électroacoustique de Bourges - France). This institution then invited Ceccarelli to work in Bourges and commissioned various electroacoustic works from him, including De Zarb à Daf  for Iranian percussion instruments.

At the end of the ‘90s Ceccarelli founded Edison Studio together with the composers Alessandro Cipriani, Mauro Cardi and Fabio Cifariello Ciardi with whom he created various soundtracks for silent movies from the second and third decades of the 20th century.  These soundtracks, performed live by the composers themselves during screenings of the films, have included those for four particularly important movies: The Last Days of Pompeii, The Cabinet of Dr. Caligari, Blackmail and Inferno. The DVDs with the soundtracks of Inferno realized by Edison Studio were released in 2011 by the Cineteca di Bologna (in the series Cinema ritrovato). Ceccarelli’s particular interest in the relationship between music and film have led him to carry out intensive studies on contemporary cinema and in 2007 he published an article on Stanley Kubrick's Eyes Wide Shut.

Starting from 2000, he realized a series of compositions for musical theater and site-specific art installations for the Ravenna Festival, including In Die Resurrectionis, for the Basilica of San Vitale (Ravenna) and Bianco Nero Piano Forte, in collaboration with the photographers Lelli & Masotti and the writer Mara Cantoni, which was located in the Biblioteca Classense.

Also beginning in 2000 Ceccarelli began an artistic collaboration with the Teatro delle Albe, culminating with two works of musical theater, L’isola di Alcina (The Island of Alcina) and Ouverture Alcina, with a text by Nevio Spadoni in Romagnol dialect.  These two creations were staged in Italy, as well as in several European cities (Paris, Berlin, Moscow) and in New York. Another work of musical theater that Ceccarelli realized in the same period was the Requiem  staged by the theater company Fanny & Alexander and performed for the first time at the Ravenna Festival in 2001. For these works he received the Italian Theater Critics Award of the Premio UBU (an award where the jury consists of the reviewers in the most important Italian newspapers and magazines) in 2002 (which on that occasion was awarded to a musician for the first time), as well as the prize of Belgrade International Theatre Festival (Serbia) and that of the MESS International Theatre Festival of Sarajevo.

During this period Ceccarelli continued to compose music for dance performances, and he composed the music for Live* with the Norwegian dance company Wee/Francesco Scavetta. From 2009 to 2011 he worked with the South African choreographer Robyn Orlin and in collaboration with Alessandro Cipriani he created the music for several dance performances including Have you hugged kissed and respected your brown Venus today?, which was staged at the Théâtre de la Ville in Paris and the Grand Théâtre de Luxembourg.

In 2012 Ceccarelli met the double-bass player Daniel Roccato and with him he established an improvisational duo with the double-bass as a source for the electronic processing of sound in real time.  In 2013 he returned to composing for the cinema and with Alessandro Cipriani he made the music for the film by Michel Comte The Girl from Nagasaki,  a reworking of Puccini’s opera Madame Butterfly set in the '60s, which premiered at the Sundance Film Festival in 2014.

Luigi Ceccarelli’s works have been released on CD by RaiTrade, CNI, Luca Sossella Editore, Edipan, BMG-Ariola, Newtone Gmeb / UNESCO / Cime and the Venice Biennale.
Since 1979 he has been the head professor of Electronic Music Composition at the Conservatory of Perugia.

Catalogue of main works

Musical theatre 
 Ouverture Alcina (2004/2009) - text Nevio Spadoni, directed by Marco Martinelli
 +/-  (2009) - directed by Luigi De Angelis-Fanny & Alexander 
 Tupac Amaru, la deconquista, il Pachacuti  (1997/2007) - on a text by Gianni Toti
 La Mano, de profundis rock (2005) –  on a text by Luca Doninelli, directed by Marco Martinelli
 Francesca da Rimini (2004) – on a text by Nevio Spadoni, directed by Elena Bucci
 Galla Placidia  (2003) – on a text by Nevio Spadoni, directed by Elena Bucci
 Requiem  (2001) - directed by Luigi de Angelis
 L’isola di Alcina  (2000) – on a text by Nevio Spadoni, directed by Marco Martinelli
 Esercizi di Patologia  (1995/1997) – on a text by Valerio Magrelli
 Macchine Virtuose  (1993/1994) – a staged concert by Gianfranco Lucchino
 Isla Coco   (1985/1987) - with ElectraVox Ensemble.
 music for Abominable A (1979) – with "Altro, gruppo di lavoro intercodice"

Electroacoustic music 
 X-Traces (2011/2013) - with Daniele Roccato - for double bass and live electronics
 Il contatore di nuvole (2012) – for piano and samples of prepared piano 
 I luoghi comuni non sono segnati sulle carte - with Edison Studio, on a text by Marco Martinelli
 Armonia dell’ascendente (2011) -  with the Tibetan monks of the Drepung Loseling monastery
 Cadenza (2011) – acousmatic music
 Birds  (1995/2011) – for bass clarinet, samples of bass clarinet and birdsongs 
 Quattro pezzi su poesie di Giovanni Pascoli (2003/2007): Notte d’Inverno, nella Nebbia, l’Uccellino del Freddo, le Rane  – for reciting voice and elaborated sounds, text from four poems by Giovanni Pascoli
 Neuromante  (1991/2007) - for alto sax and elaborated sounds of sax
 Quanti (1991/2007) - for clarinet and elaborated sounds of clarinets
 Anima di Metallo (1990/2007) - for three percussionists and elaborated sounds of percussions
 Exsultet  (1996/2007) - for choir of gregorian chant and electronic elaboration
 Cadenza esplosa (2006) - acousmatic piece
 Inferi (2001) - for reciting voice and elaborated sounds, on a text by Mara Cantoni
 In die resurrectionis (1999) - for choir of gregorian chant and electronic elaboration
 Respiri  (1999) - for french horn and elaborated samples of horn
 A propos de la chambre a coucher de Philippe II dans l’église de l’Escorial  (1998) - for reciting voices and elaborated sounds, on a text by Valerio Magrelli
 De zarb a daf (1996) - for zarb, daf, and sampled sounds of zarb and daf
 Aracne  (1996) - for reciting voices and elaborated sounds, on a text by Guido Barbieri
 Luce-ombra (from Anihccam),(1995) - for string quartet and samples of strings
 Aleph con zero (1993/1994) - for two pianos, two marimbas and sampled sounds 
 Discussione del 3000 (from Anihccam) (1992) - for two percussionists and sampled sounds of voice
 Aura in visibile (1991/1992) - for flute, piano and vibrating exciters 
 Etaoin shrdlu  (1985) - for Double bass and live electronics - with Marcello Federici
 Titanic & Icarus spa  (1984) - for amplified cymbals and tam-tams, and vibrating exciters
 Incontro con Rama  (1982) - for trombone and live electronics
 Koramachine  (1981) - for violin with ringmodulator and seven amplified instruments 
 Il contingente cambia colore  (1975) – for magnetic tape

Soundtracks for cinema 
 music for The Girl from Nagasaki (2013) - with Alessandro Cipriani – a film by Michel Comte (2013) editions M4 Films
 music for Blackmail (2013) - with Edison Studio – a film by Alfred Hitchcock (1929)
 music for Inferno (2008) - with Edison Studio – a film by Francesco Bertolini e Adolfo Padovan (1911)
 music for Das Cabinet des Dr. Caligari (2003) – with Edison Studio – a film by Robert Wiene (1919)
 music for Gli Ultimi Giorni di Pompei (2001) – with Edison Studio – a film by Eleuterio Ridolfi (1913)
 music for Opus II  (1997) – a film by Walter Ruttmann (1921)
 music for Filmstudie  (1997) – a film by Hans Richter (1926)

Audiovisual works and installations 
 Pic (2009/2011)) – video
 Bianco Nero Piano Forte  (2000/2009) – installation - proses and verses by Mara Cantoni, images by Lelli & Masotti

Works for radio 
 music for La Commedia della Vanità  (1998) – by Elias Canetti, adapted and directed by Giorgio Pressburgher
 I Viaggi in Tasca, 20 luoghi mentali  (1995) – on twenty texts by Valerio Magrelli
 La Guerra dei Dischi  (1994) – on a text by Stefano Benni

Music for dance 
 music for … Have you hugged, kissed and respected your brown Venus today? (2011) – with Alessandro Cipriani – choreography by Robyn Orlin
 Strangely Enough (2010) – with Daniele Roccato and Wee Company – choreography by Francesco Scavetta
 music for With astonishment I note the dog (revisited) (2009) – with Alessandro Cipriani – choreography by Robyn Orlin
 Hey dude, let’s stick around a bit longer this time (2005/2008) – choreography by Francesco Scavetta
 music for A Glimpse of Hope (2008) – choreography by Simone Sandroni, Lenka Flory
 music for Margine Buio (2007) – choreography by Simone Sandroni, Lenka Flory
 Live*  (2002) – choreography by Francesco Scavetta
 music for Tre Soli Italiani  (2000) – three choreographyes by Francesco Scavetta, Monica Francia and Antonio Montanile
 Naturalmente Tua  (1992) – choreography by Lucia Latour
 Anihccam, (1989) – choreography by Lucia Latour
 On y Tombe on n’y Tombe (1988) – with Luca Spagnoletti – choreography by Lucia Latour
 Frilli Troupe (1986) – con Luca Spagnoletti – choreography by Lucia Latour
 La Lu La (1984) – choreography by Lucia Latour
 Spatium Teca (1982) – choreography by Lucia Latour
 Porte à Faux,  (1981) – choreography by Lucia Latour

Main CD and DVD

Monographic CD
 La Mano (2006)– Luca Sossella editions 
 Exsultet (2005) – Rai Trade editions RTC006
 L’isola di Alcina (2000) – Ravenna Teatro editions CD 01/00
 Macchine Virtuose (1996) - Edipan editions CCD 3062
 La guerra dei Dischi/Naturalmente Tua (1995) – Edipan editions CCD 3054
 Anihccam  (1992) – BMG-Ariola editions CCD 3005

CD and DVD with Edison Studio
 Inferno (2011) – DVD Il Cinema Ritrovato editions – Cineteca di Bologna
 Edison Studio (2007) – DVD Auditorium editions EdiLDC278 1139/40
 Zarbing (2005) – CD edition La Frontiera LFDL 18401 – RaiTrade editions RTP00902005

References

Bibliography

 AA.VV., item "Luigi Ceccarelli", in Dizionario Enciclopedico Universale della Musica e dei Musicisti, edited by Alberto Basso, Volume appendice 2005, UTET, Torino, 2004, p. 111, .
 AA.VV., item "Anihccam", in Dizionario Enciclopedico Universale della Musica e dei Musicisti, edited by Alberto Basso, Volume I titoli e i personaggi, UTET, Torino, 1999, p. 85, .

External links 
 Luigi Ceccarelli official website

Pages translated from Italian Wikipedia
Italian classical composers
Italian male classical composers
Avant-garde composers
20th-century classical composers
21st-century classical composers
1953 births
Living people
Electroacoustic music composers
20th-century Italian composers
People from Rimini
20th-century Italian male musicians
21st-century Italian male musicians